Antoine Frisch (born 1 June 1996) is a French-born, Irish-qualified rugby union player for Irish province Munster in the United Rugby Championship and Champions Cup. He plays as a centre.

Career

In France
Frisch played for Stade Français and Massy in their academy systems in his early career, before signing a professional contract with Tarbes for the 2017–18 season. Frisch left Tarbes to rejoin to Massy in the Fédérale 1 competition for the 2019–20 season, and then joined their rivals Rouen for the 2020–21 season.

In England
Frisch moved to England to join Bristol Bears, who compete in the Premiership Rugby competition, from the 2021–22 season. Frisch's final appearance for Bristol was in their 29–28 win against Gloucester on 22 April 2022, as a shoulder injury sustained during the game required surgery and ruled him out of the remainder of the season.

In Ireland
Frisch, who is Irish-qualified via a grandmother who was born in Dublin, joined Irish province Munster on a three-year contract from the 2022–23 season, and made his senior competitive debut for the province as a replacement in their 20–13 defeat away to Welsh side Cardiff in round one of the 2022–23 United Rugby Championship on 17 September 2022. Frisch made his first start for Munster in their historic 28–14 win against a South Africa XV in Páirc Uí Chaoimh on 10 November 2022.

International
Frisch was selected in the Emerging Ireland squad that travelled to South Africa to participate in the Toyota Challenge against Currie Cup teams Free State Cheetahs, Griquas and Pumas in September–October 2022. He featured as a replacement in Emerging Ireland's 54–7 opening win against Griquas on 30 September, and started in the 28–24 win against the Pumas on 5 October. Frisch was selected in the French Barbarians squad to face Fiji on 19 November as part of the 2022 Autumn Nations Series, however, he had to withdraw from the squad due to a thigh issue.

References

External links
Munster Profile
Bristol Bears Profile

Premiership Rugby Profile
All Rugby Profile

Living people
1996 births
French rugby union players
Tarbes Pyrénées Rugby players
RC Massy players
Rouen Normandie Rugby players
Bristol Bears players
Munster Rugby players
Rugby union centres